Ragnhild Magerøy (9 July 1920 – 16 November 2010) was a Norwegian novelist, essayist and poet. She is principally known as a historical novelist.

Magerøy was born at Fræna  in Møre og Romsdal as the youngest of six siblings.  In 1958 she moved with her family to Oslo where she was given the opportunity to study historical material at the University of Oslo Library. She became focused in  historic but often forgotten female figures.  Her female characters are often high-spirited  and center to the plot.

She made her literary début in 1957 with the novel Gunhild, the first volume of a  novel trilogy about the lives of  women in a small rural village
in the 19th century.   Her subsequent novels were often placed within the Norwegian Medieval Period.
She was awarded the Dobloug Prize in 1975.

Selected works
Dronning uten rike, 1966, 
Mens nornene spinner, 1969
Himmelen er gul, 1970, 
Spotlight på sagaen, 1991,
Den hvite steinen, 1995, 
Hallfrid, 1997.

References

1920 births
2010 deaths
People from Møre og Romsdal
20th-century Norwegian novelists
Norwegian essayists
Norwegian women poets
20th-century Norwegian poets
20th-century essayists
20th-century Norwegian women writers